Sergio Gabriel Rondina (born 11 March 1971) is an Argentine football manager and former player who played as a midfielder.

Career
Rondina was a footballer who played professionally in Argentina and Ecuador in the 1990s and early 2000s. He began his career, and had the longest stint with Arsenal de Sarandí. He became a football manager in 2005 in the lower divisions of Argentina, and worked his way up to the Argentine Primera División.

Personal life
Rondina is known for his colorful outfits, having a collection of over 40 suits. Since 2016, he has worn a different outfit to every matchday.

References

External links
 
 
 
 

1971 births
Living people
Sportspeople from Buenos Aires Province
Argentine football managers
Argentine footballers
Club Atlético Atlanta managers
Arsenal de Sarandí managers
Nueva Chicago managers
Chacarita Juniors footballers
Defensa y Justicia footballers
Club Atlético Atlanta footballers
Argentine Primera División managers
Primera Nacional players
Association football midfielders
Club Atlético Colón managers
Central Córdoba de Santiago del Estero managers